VIII Corps was a British Army corps formation that existed during the First and Second World Wars. In the latter, it took part in the Normandy Campaign in 1944, where it was involved in Operation Epsom and Operation Goodwood. It would later play a supporting role in Operation Market Garden and finish the war by advancing from the Rhine to the Baltic Sea.

Prior to the First World War
In 1876, a Mobilisation Scheme was published for the forces in Great Britain and Ireland, which included eight army corps of the 'Active Army'. The '8th Corps' was to be headquartered at Edinburgh and was primarily militia formation. In 1880, its order of battle was as follows:

1st Division (Edinburgh)
1st Brigade (Edinburgh)
Kerry Militia (Tralee), Northumberland Militia (Alnwick), Fermanagh Militia (Enniskillen)
2nd Brigade
Antrim Militia (Belfast), Cavan Militia (Cavan), Donegal Militia (Lifford)
Divisional Troops
50th Foot (Edinburgh), Ayrshire Yeomanry (Ayr)
Artillery
O/2nd Brigade RA (Glasgow)
2nd Division (Glasgow)
1st Brigade (Glasgow)
Highland Borderers Militia (Stirling), Highland Rifles Militia (Dingwall), Scottish Borderers Militia (Dumfries)
2nd Brigade (Hamilton)
Cumberland Militia (Carlisle), 1st Durham Militia (Barnard Castle), 2nd Durham Militia (Durham)
Divisional Troops
Queen's Own Lanarkshire Yeomanry (Glasgow)
3rd Division (Melrose)
1st Brigade (Melrose)
East York Militia (Beverley), North York Militia (Richmond), Westmoreland Militia (Carlisle)
2nd Brigade
5th Royal Lancashire Militia (Burnley), 6th Royal Lancashire Militia (Richmond), 7th Royal Lancashire Militia (Bury)
Divisional Troops
Northumberland and Newcastle Yeomanry (Newcastle)
Cavalry Brigade
Westmorland and Cumberland Yeomanry (Penrith), Lanark Yeomanry (Lanark), East Lothian Yeomanry (Dunbar)

This scheme had been dropped by 1881.

First World War

Gallipoli
VIII Corps was first formed at Gallipoli during the First World War. The main British battle front was at Cape Helles on the tip of the Gallipoli peninsula. As the battle became protracted, more British divisions arrived as reinforcements. In May 1915, these divisions were arranged as the British Army Corps, which was then redesignated as VIII Corps in June. The corps commander was Lieutenant-General Aylmer Hunter-Weston. When Hunter-Weston relinquished command due to illness, the corps was commanded on a temporary basis by General Francis Davies.

During the Gallipoli campaign, the corps contained the following units:
29th Division - (moved to IX Corps at Suvla in August)
42nd (East Lancashire) Infantry Division
52nd (Lowland) Infantry Division
Royal Naval Division
29th Indian Infantry Brigade - (moved to Australian and New Zealand Army Corps in August)
Corps of Royal Engineers - 13th Base Park Company, 254th Tunnelling Company and a Postal unit

Western Front
After the evacuation of Gallipoli, the corps was reformed in France in March 1916, once again under the command of Hunter-Weston, and participated in the Battle of the Somme.

VIII Corps was disbanded in June 1918 when Hunter-Weston moved to the XVIII Corps; however, this corps was then redesignated as VIII Corps in July 1918.

Second World War

Home Defence
VIII Corps formed part of Home Forces in the UK during the early part of the Second World War. During the Autumn of 1940, it presided over the 3rd and 48th (South Midland) Divisions. Later, it would also command the 77th Infantry Division. It was based at Pyrland Hall near Cheddon Fitzpaine in Somerset and its mission was to command the defence of Somerset, Devon, Cornwall and Bristol.

North West Europe
VIII Corps fought on the western front in 1944 and 1945 as part of the Second Army. From 21 January to 27 November 1944, it was commanded by Lieutenant-General Richard O'Connor.

At the start of the Normandy Campaign, it comprised:
Guards Armoured Division (later transferred to XXX Corps)
11th Armoured Division (later transferred to XXX Corps)
15th (Scottish) Infantry Division (later transferred to XII Corps )
6th Guards Tank Brigade
8th Army Group Royal Artillery
61st (Caernarvon & Denbigh Yeomanry) Medium Regiment, RA
63rd (Midland) Medium Regiment, RA
 77th (Duke of Lancaster's Own Yeomanry) Medium Regiment, RA
 146th (Pembroke & Cardiganshire Yeomanry) Medium Regiment, RA
53rd Heavy Regiment, RA
Corps Troops:
2nd Household Cavalry Regiment
91st (Argyll and Sutherland Highlanders) Anti-Tank Regiment, RA
121st (Leicestershire Regiment) Light Anti-Aircraft Regiment, RA
10th Survey Regiment, RA
VIII Corps Troops, Royal Engineers
VIII Corps Signals

It played a major role in Operations Epsom, Jupiter, Goodwood and Bluecoat, before being reduced in size and moved to the reserve prior to the breakout from Normandy.

The Corps fought in a supporting role during Operation Market Garden on the east flank of XXX Corps with XII Corps to the west of XXX Corps, capturing the Dutch towns of Deurne and Helmond, and took part in the advance on Venray and Venlo. Then in Operation Constellation beginning on 12 October 1944. VIII Corps, now commanded by Lieutenant-General Evelyn Barker, later took part in Operation Plunder, crossed the Elbe and occupied Plön in Schleswig-Holstein.

Post-war
In the immediate post-war period, the corps formed VIII Corps District in Schleswig-Holstein before being disbanded in 1946. Its final composition was:

 4th Armoured Brigade
 Jewish Infantry Brigade
 7th Armoured Division
 22nd Armoured Brigade
 131st Infantry Brigade (detached to Berlin)
 13th Infantry Brigade (attached from 5th Division)
 15th (Scottish) Infantry Division
 46th Infantry Brigade

General Officers Commanding
Commanders included:
 24 May – 17 Jul 1915 Lieutenant-General Sir Aylmer Hunter-Weston
 17 Jul – 24 Jul 1915 Lieutenant-General Sir Frederick Stopford (temporary)
 24 Jul – 8 Aug 1915 Major-General William Douglas (acting)
 8 Aug 1915 – 27 Jan 1916 Lieutenant-General Sir Francis Davies
–
 18 Mar 1916 – 22 Jun 1918 Lieutenant-General Sir Aylmer Hunter-Weston
–
 2 Jul 1918 Lieutenant-General Sir Aylmer Hunter-Weston
–
 Jul 1940 – May 1941 Lieutenant-General Harold Franklyn
 May–Nov 1941 Lieutenant-General Kenneth Anderson
 Nov 1941 – Jan 1943 Lieutenant-General Arthur Edward Grasett
 Jan–Jul 1943 Lieutenant-General Herbert Lumsden
 Jul–Aug 1943 Lieutenant-General Sir Richard McCreery
 Nov 1943 – Jan 1944 Lieutenant-General John Harding
 Jan–Nov 1944 Lieutenant-General Sir Richard O'Connor
 Dec 1944 – Apr 1946 Lieutenant-General Evelyn Barker

Notes

References
 Anon, British Army of the Rhine Battlefield Tour: Operation Bluecoat, Germany: BAOR, 1947/Uckfield: Naval and Military Press, 2021, ISBN 978-1-78331-812-4.

George Forty, British Army Handbook 1939-1945, Stroud: Sutton Publishing, 1998.
Graham E. Watson & Richard A. Rinaldi, The British Army in Germany (BAOR and after): An organizational history 1947-2004, Tiger Lily Publications, 2005.
 Lt-Col H.F. Joslen, Orders of Battle, United Kingdom and Colonial Formations and Units in the Second World War, 1939–1945, London: HM Stationery Office, 1960/Uckfield: Naval & Military Press, 2003, ISBN 1-843424-74-6.
 JPS Cigarette card series, Army, Corps and Divisional Signs 1914–1918, John Player and sons, 1920s.

External sources
The Long, Long Trail
Royal Artillery 1939-45
Regiments.org

British field corps
Corps of the British Army in World War I
Corps of the British Army in World War II
Military units and formations of the British Empire in World War II